Goniapteryx is a genus of moths of the family Erebidae. The genus was erected by Maximilian Perty in 1833.

Species
Goniapteryx elegans (1878) Jamaica
Goniapteryx sergilia (Stoll, [1780]) Suriname
Goniapteryx servia (Stoll, 1782) Texas in the US to Amazonas in Brazil

References

Hypocalinae
Moth genera
Taxa named by Maximilian Perty